Whyalla Stuart is a suburb of the city of Whyalla in South Australia. It was gazetted in 1967 with the boundaries adjusted in 1977 and 2000. It is bounded on the south side by the Lincoln Highway.

Stuart High School is near the northern edge of Whyalla Stuart, adjacent to the Whyalla Stuart Campus R-7 primary school which replaced the Whyalla Stuart Primary and Junior Primary schools in 2008.

References

Suburbs of Whyalla